EP300-interacting inhibitor of differentiation 1 is a protein that in humans is encoded by the EID1 gene.

Interactions
EID1 has been shown to interact with EP300 and Retinoblastoma protein.

References

Further reading